Betty Boop's Bizzy Bee is a 1932 Fleischer Studios animated short film starring Betty Boop and featuring Bimbo and Koko the Clown.

Plot

Betty's the owner and operator of the Bizzy Bee, a popular lunch wagon in the city. Even though wheat cakes are the only food item on the menu, the place is always packed, thanks to Betty Boop's cute face.  A running gag centers around a hippopotamus vainly requesting that someone "please pass the sugar"; in the end, he's covered with sugar.

References

External links
Betty Boop's Bizzy Bee at IMDB
Betty Boop's Bizzy Bee at the Big Cartoon Database
 Betty Boop's Bizzy Bee on YouTube

1932 films
1932 animated films
Betty Boop cartoons
1930s American animated films
American black-and-white films
Paramount Pictures short films
Fleischer Studios short films
Short films directed by Dave Fleischer
Films set in restaurants